Sarangesa haplopa is a species of butterfly in the family Hesperiidae. It is found in the eastern part of the Democratic Republic of the Congo, Uganda, western Kenya, Tanzania and Malawi.

References

Butterflies described in 1907
Celaenorrhinini